Mahmudiye was a ship of the line of the Ottoman Navy. It was a three-masted three-decked 128-gunned sailing ship, which could perhaps be considered to be one of the few completed heavy first-rate battleships in the world. Mahmudiye, with a roaring lion as the ship's figurehead, was intended to serve to reconstitute the morale of the nation after the loss of the fleet at the Battle of Navarino in 1827. The flagship was for many years the largest warship in the world.

Characteristics
The 201 × 56 kadem (1 kadem = 37.887 cm) or   ship of the line carried 1,280 sailors on board.

It was a 120-gun ship of the line, with guns ranging from 3-pounders to massive 500-pounders that fired stone shot. These guns were mounted on the broadside across three decks. At the time of her completion, it was the largest sailing ship ever built.

Service history
It was constructed by the naval architect Mehmet Kalfa and the naval engineer Mehmet Efendi on the order of Mahmud II (reigned between 1808–1839) at the Imperial Arsenal, on the Golden Horn in Constantinople.

Egyptian-Ottoman Wars

At the outbreak of the First Egyptian–Ottoman War in 1831, prompted by the Egyptian invasion of Palestine, Mahmudiye was already in poor condition, despite being only a few years old. Much of her hull was dry-rotted, though it still served as the Ottoman flagship during the war. During the war, the Ottoman fleet, along with a squadron from the British Royal Navy blockaded the main Egyptian naval base at İskenderun. This included a long-range bombardment on 18 August 1831. The war ended in 1833 following the intervention of Russia on behalf of the Ottoman government and pressure from Britain, France, and Austria on Egypt to withdraw, but unresolved tensions between the Eyalet of Egypt and the central government resulted in the Second Egyptian–Ottoman War of 1839–1841.

After the death of Sultan Mahmud II on 1 July 1839, an internal power struggle resulted in the installation of the pro-Russian Koca Hüsrev Mehmed Pasha under Sultan Abdulmejid I. On 4 July 1839, the commander of the Ottoman fleet, displeased over the Russian influence in the new government, decided to take the bulk of the Ottoman fleet, including Mahmudiye, over to the Egyptian side. He set sail for Beşik Bay, where an international fleet composed of British, French, and Russian warships was present. With assistance from the pro-Egyptian French, he then moved the fleet to Kos, where he entered into negotiations with Egypt to accept the fleet at İskenderun on 14 July. A year later, in July 1840, the British issued an ultimatum for Egypt to return the ships and surrender the Levant to the Ottoman government; the Egyptians refused, and so the Royal Navy bombarded all of the major ports in the region, culminating in the Bombardment of Acre on 1 November. This forced the Egyptians to capitulate, and on 27 November Mahmudiye and the rest of the Ottoman ships were released to return to Constantinople.

Later career

Mahmudiye participated in  the Siege of Sevastopol (1854–55) during the Crimean War (1854–56) under the command of Admiral of the Fleet Kayserili Ahmet Pasha. It was honored with the title Gazi following her successful mission in Sevastopol.

With the introduction of steam power at the end of the 1840s, the conversion of the pure sail-driven ship into a steamer was considered. On inspecting the hull in Britain in the late 1850s, however, it was discovered to be badly rotted, and not worth reconstructing. The machinery that had been allocated to Mahmudiye was instead installed on the frigate .

During the Russo-Turkish War of 1877–1878, Mahmudiye was placed into service as a troop transport, as the government lacked sufficient transport ships. The ship's great size made her an effective transport, owing to her ability to carry a large number of troops. On 27 December, four Russian torpedo boats attacked Mahmudiye and the ironclad  while they were moored in Batumi, but all of their attacks missed.

Notes

References

Further reading

External links
 
https://www.tdefenceagency.com/mahmudiye-efsanesi-doguyor/ - (Page in Turkish about Mahmudiye with images)

1829 ships
Ships built in the Ottoman Empire
Crimean War naval ships of the Ottoman Empire
Ships of the line of the Ottoman Navy
Three-masted ships
Age of Sail naval ships of the Ottoman Empire